W.A.K.O. World Championships 2007 in Coimbra were the joint 16th edition of the W.A.K.O. world championships and was the second event (the Belgrade event having been held a month previously).  The championships were for amateur male and female kickboxers and martial artists, covering the following categories; Full-Contact, Semi-Contact, Musical Forms and Aero Kickboxing.  In the contact kickboxing categories (Semi and Full), weight classes ranged from light bantamweight (51 kg/112 lbs) to super heavyweight (over 91 kg/200.6 lbs).  The Musical Forms and Aero Kickboxing categories did not have weight classes but had different forms.  More information on the categories, weight classes and rules is provided in the various sections below.  In total there were around 600 competitors at the event, representing fifty countries from five continents, competing in forty-three competitions.  The Coimbra championships were held at the Pavilhão Multiusos de Coimbra in Coimbra, Portugal from Monday, November 26 to Sunday, December 2, 2007.

Full-Contact 

Full-Contact is kickboxing where the intention is to defeat the opponent using legal techniques applying full force.  Legal strikes include punches and kicks to the head (front, side and forehead), the torso (front and side) and foot/feet (sweeps).  Attacks that are illegal include strikes to the top of the head, the back, the top of the shoulders, the neck and anywhere below the belt (except for foot sweeps).  As with most forms of amateur competition, all fighters are required to wear protection for their head, teeth, breast (women only) groin, shin and feet, and must fight with the standard 10oz gloves.

A minimum of six kicks must be thrown each round or points may be deducted by the referee. Each fight is three, two-minute rounds and is scored by three judges. The judges will score successful (legal) strikes that are not blocked, and are thrown with full power. Illegal moves may result in points deduction or if repeated, disqualification. In the event of a draw after three rounds the judges will base the victor on who was stronger in the final round, or failing that will use their remarks from each round to deduce who wins. Victory can be achieved by a point's decision, technical knockout or knockout, abandonment (when one fighter gives up), disqualification or by a walkover (other fighter is unable to participate). If a fighter is knocked down three times in the fight he will automatically lose via technical knockout. More detail on Full-Contact rules can be found at the official W.A.K.O. website.

At Coimbra the men had twelve weight classes ranging from light bantamweight (51 kg/112.2 lbs) to super heavyweight (over 91 kg/200.2 lbs), while the women's had seven, ranging from bantamweight (51 kg/112.2 lbs) to super heavyweight (over 70 kg/154 lbs).  By the end of the championships, the nation that dominated Full-Contact was Russia with an impressive haul of ten gold, four silvers and one bronze, in both the male and female categories.

Full-Contact (Men) Medals Table

Full-Contact (Women) Medals Table

Semi-Contact 

This form of kickboxing is defined by the competitors trying to outscore one another with the use of light and well-controlled contact, with the emphasis being placed on delivery, technique and speed, using both legal hand and foot techniques.  It is similar to Light-Contact kickboxing only that less force is used in Semi-Contact, with almost all fights won on points, although matches have been stopped by the referee due to a KO/TKO on rare occasions.  Attacks are allowed to the head (front, side, back and forehead), torso (front and side) leg (foot sweeps only) and must be of reasonable force (not a push or a brush).  Excessive force is prohibited as are attacks to the top of the head, back, top of shoulders, neck and below the belt (aside from foot sweeps) or any kicks using the heel (the sole of foot must be used instead).  It is also illegal to grab an opponent or throw them to the ground.  Semi-Contact is seen as a good starting position for fighters who want fight experience without the additional physicality of Full or (to a lesser extent) Light-Contact kickboxing.  Despite the less physical nature all fighters are still required to wear protection for their head, teeth, breast (women only) groin, shin and feet, and must fight with the standard 10oz gloves.  
  
Fighters score the following points for landing a controlled strike on their opponent; punch, kick to body, foot sweep (1 point), kick to head, jumping kick to body (2 points), jumping kick to head (3 points).  Each fight is three, two-minute rounds and is scored by three judges. In the event of a draw the match will be scored electronically. Victory can be achieved by points decision, knockout or technical knockout (both rare), abandonment (when one fighter gives up), disqualification or by a walkover (the other fighter is unable to participate).  More detail on Semi-Contact rules can be found at the official W.A.K.O. website.

Semi-Contact uses slightly different weight classes  from Full-Contact kickboxing.  At Coimbra the men's Semi-Contact competition had nine weight classes ranging from 57 kg/125.4 lbs to over 94 kg/206.8 lbs, while the women's had six, ranging from 50 kg/110 lbs to over 70 kg/154 lbs.  There was also a team event at the competition, involving three men and one woman for each of the participating nations, with the woman to be paired against another woman only.  By the end of the championships, Hungary was the top nation in Semi-Contact with four gold, three silver and two bronze medals, in the male, female and team categories.

Semi-Contact (Men) Medals Table

Semi-Contact (Women) Medals Table

Semi-Contact (Team) Medals Table

Musical Forms 
Musical Forms is a non-physical competition which involves the contestant fighting against imaginary opponents using Martial Arts techniques to music of their choice.  There are no weight classes as with most other W.A.K.O. categories although there are separate male and female competitions and, unlike the contact categories, an individual country was allowed more than one competitor.  There are four separate categories in Musical Forms:

 Hard Styles – coming from Karate and Taekwondo, all competitors have 1 minute and 30 seconds to display their routine, as well as a 30-second presentation.
 Soft Styles – coming from Kung Fu and Wu-Sha, all competitors have 2 minutes to display their routine, as well as a 30-second presentation.
 Hard Styles with Weapons – using weapons such as Kama, Sai, Tonfa, Nunchaku, Bō, Katana, length of routine is the same as with Hard Styles, weapons must be blunt.
 Soft Styles with Weapons - Naginata, Nunchaku, Tai Chi Chuan Sword, Whip Chain, length of routine is the same as with Soft Styles, weapons must be blunt.

Points can be deducted for routines that are too short or go past the allocated time.   Points are also deducted  for contestants who drop weapons, loss of synchronization with the music, lose balance, perform illegal moves such as western break dancing etc.  The competitors are allowed three gymnastic moves per performance, any more results in a point(s) deduction.  Disqualification can occur if too many errors occur.  Points are awarded for successful form and technique (e.g. delivery of kicks and punches), balance, degree of difficulty involved in a move, synchronization and more.  The winner of each category is scored after seven presentations with points scored out of ten for the performance.  If a fighter is tied on points after the presentation they will share a spot (or medal).  More information on Musical Forms and the rules can be found on the W.A.K.O. website.  By the end of the championships, Russia was the strongest nation in Musical Forms having won four golds, four silvers and five bronzes in both the male and female categories.

Musical Forms (Men) Medals Table

Musical Forms (Women) Medals Table

Aero Kickboxing 

As with Musical Forms, Aero Kickboxing is a non physical competition, involving aerobic and kickboxing techniques in time to specifically selected music.  This music must be between 135 and 155 b.p.m. and must not contain any swear words or inappropriate noises.  There are no weight divisions like in other forms of kickboxing in W.A.K.O. but there are separate male, female and team categories, each split into 'with (aerobic) step' or 'without (aerobic) step', and, unlike the contact categories, an individual country was allowed more than one competitor, with the team event even having several teams from the same country.  Each performance must be between 1.5 and 2 minutes long and be 70% kickboxing and 30% aerobics, with at least five kicks/punches per period (every 32 musical beats).

Points are deducted for any hesitation or loss of balance, insufficient number of kickboxing or aerobic techniques, touching the floor with any part of body other than the feet, over repetition of the same moves, and loss of synchronization with teammates in team competition.  Competitors can be disqualified for inappropriate music (with swearing/unsuitable noises) or the wearing of sports bras.  Points are rewarded for clean technique with difficulty of moves being taken into consideration and good synchronization with teammates in team competition.  The winner of each category is scored after seven separate performances, with points scored between 7 and 10 for each performance.  More information on Musical Forms and the rules can be found on the W.A.K.O. website.  Hungary and Slovenia were joint top in Aero Kickboxing at the end of the championships, having won two golds and two silvers each.

Aero Kickboxing (Men) Medals Table

Aero Kickboxing (Women) Medals Table

Aero Kickboxing (Team) Medals Table

Overall Medals Standing (Top 5) 

The top nation at the W.A.K.O. Amateur World Championships in Coimbra was Russia (who was also the top nation at the event held in Belgrade the previous month).  The country gained fifteen golds, nine silvers and ten bronzes, across all categories, male and female.

See also 
 List of WAKO Amateur World Championships
 List of WAKO Amateur European Championships

References

External links 
 WAKO World Association of Kickboxing Organizations Official Site

WAKO Amateur World Championships events
2007 in kickboxing
Kickboxing in Portugal